The 2021–22 Georgia Lady Bulldogs basketball team represented the University of Georgia during the 2021–22 NCAA Division I women's basketball season. The Lady Bulldogs, led by seventh-year head coach Joni Taylor, played their home games at Stegeman Coliseum and competed as members of the Southeastern Conference (SEC).

Previous season
The Lady Bulldogs finished the season 21–7 (10–5 SEC) to finish in fourth in the conference. The Lady Bulldogs were invited to the 2021 NCAA Division I women's basketball tournament where they defeated Drexel in the First Round before losing to Oregon in the Second Round.

Offseason

Departures

2021 recruiting class

Roster

Schedule

|-
!colspan=9 style=| Non-conference regular season

|-
!colspan=9 style=| SEC regular season

|-
!colspan=9 style=| SEC Tournament

|-
!colspan=9 style=| NCAA tournament

See also
2021–22 Georgia Bulldogs basketball team

References

Georgia Lady Bulldogs basketball seasons
Georgia
Georgia Lady Bulldogs
Georgia Lady Bulldogs
Georgia